Yili Road (ultimately named after the Ili River) is a station on Line 10 of the Shanghai Metro, located in Changning District. It opened on 10 April 2010.

Places nearby
Shanghai Takashimaya

References

Railway stations in Shanghai
Line 10, Shanghai Metro
Shanghai Metro stations in Changning District
Railway stations in China opened in 2010